The Catholic Church in Malawi is part of the worldwide Catholic Church, under the spiritual leadership of the Pope in Rome and the Malawi bishops.

History
The first Catholic missionaries were White Fathers (Pères Blancs in French) who arrived in Malawi in 1889. By 1904, the White Fathers had three permanent mission stations at Kachebere, Likuni, and Mua, and the Montforts had two missions, at Nguludi and Nzama. Most of the White Fathers were French and, among the early leaders, were Bishops Louis Auneau, Joseph Dupont, and Mathurin Guillemé. It was not until 1937–38 that the first Malawi priests were ordained: Cornelio Chitsulo, Alfred Finye.

Today
Today there are over 2 million Catholics in Malawi - around a third of Christians and a fifth of the total population. There are 2 archdioceses and 6 dioceses:
Archdiocese of Blantyre
Diocese of Chikwawa
Diocese of Mangochi
Diocese of Zomba
Archdiocese of Lilongwe
Diocese of Dedza
Diocese of Karonga
Diocese of Mzuzu

See also
 Christianity in Malawi
 List of Catholic dioceses in Malawi
 List of Christian denominations in Malawi

References

 
White Fathers
Malawi
Malawi
1889 establishments in Africa